David Armine Howarth (28 July 1912 – 2 July 1991) was a British naval officer, boatbuilder, historian and author.

Biography 

After graduating from the University of Cambridge, he became a war correspondent for BBC radio at the start of World War II.  Howarth joined the Navy after the fall of France. He served in the Special Operations Executive (SOE) and helped set up the Shetland Bus, an SOE operation manned by Norwegians running a clandestine route between Shetland and Norway. He was second in command at the Naval base in Shetland. For his contributions to espionage operations against the German occupation of Norway, he received King Haakon VII's Cross of Liberty. The King also made Howarth a Chevalier First Class of the Order of St Olav.

After the war, he wrote numerous books on naval and military history, including a memoir of the Shetland Bus. He also edited My Land and My People, the first autobiography by the 14th Dalai Lama, which was published in 1962.

There is a good obituary in The Guardian 5 July 1991 

Howarth died on 2 July 1991 at the age of 78. At his request, his ashes were scattered over the waters of Lunna Voe, Shetland, near Lunna House, the first base of the Shetland Bus operation.

Bibliography

Novels 

 Group Flashing Two (1952)
 One Night in Styria (1953)
 Thieves' Hole (1954)

Non-fiction 

Autobiographies
 Pursued by a Bear: An Autobiography (1986)

Biographies
 We Die Alone: A WWII Epic of Escape and Endurance (1955)
 The Desert King: A Life of Ibn Saud (1964)
 Great Britons (1978)
 Wellington Commander: The Iron Duke's Generalship (1985), with John Keegan and Paddy Griffith
 Nelson: The Immortal Memory (1988), written with his son Stephen HowarthA comprehensive biography of Britain's most famous Admiral.

History
 The Shetland Bus: A WWII Epic of Escape, Survival, and Adventure, or Across to Norway (1951)
 The Sledge Patrol: The True Story of the Strangest Battle Front of All, or The Sledge Patrol: A WWII Epic of Escape, Survival, and Victory (1957)
 Dawn of D-Day: These Men Were There, 6 June 1944 (1959)An account of the landing in Normandy, with many observations from participants.
 Panama: Four Hundred Years of Dreams and Cruelty, or The Golden Isthmus (1966)
 Waterloo: A Near Run Thing, or Waterloo: Day of Battle (1968)Analysis of the Battle of Waterloo, from the reports of those who fought it.
 Great Escapes (1969)
 Trafalgar: The Nelson Touch (1969)Account of the Battle of Trafalgar, between the navies of France and Great Britain in 1805.
 Sovereign of the Seas: The Story of British Sea Power or British Sea Power: How Britain Became Sovereign of the Seas (1974)The story of British sea power.
 Waterloo: A Guide to the Battlefield, or Waterloo: A Guide (1974)
 The Greek Adventure (1976)Narrative describing the Greek War of Independence in the 1820s.
 1066: The Year of the Conquest (1977)A historical narrative of the personalities and events of 1066 AD and how they changed Britain.
 The Dreadnoughts (1979), part of The Seafarers SeriesA look at the development and use of battleship technology in the First World War.
 The Men-of-War (1978), part of The Seafarers Series, in association with Time-Life editors, published by Time-Life BooksSailing war-ships from the 16th to 18th centuries.
 Famous Sea Battles (1981)
 The Voyage of the Armada, or The Voyage of the Armada: The Spanish Story (1981)An account of the Spanish Armada of 1588, seen mostly from the Spanish perspective. Much of the account references newly available Spanish material.
 Tahiti: A Paradise Lost (1983), pub. Harvill PressThe decline of Tahiti, from its discovery by H.M.S. Dolphin in June 1767
 The Story of P&O: The Peninsular & Oriental Steam Navigation Company (1986), with Stephen Howarth

True events
 The Shadow of the Dam (1961)

Adaptations 

 Suicide Mission (1954), film directed by Michael Forlong, based on book The Shetland Bus: A WWII Epic of Escape, Survival, and Adventure, and also on book None but the Brave by Frithjof Sælen
 Nine Lives (1957), film directed by Arne Skouen, based on book We Die Alone: A WWII Epic of Escape and Endurance

References

External links

Royal Navy officers
Royal Navy personnel of World War II
British military writers
1912 births
1991 deaths
Recipients of the King Haakon VII Freedom Cross
20th-century British historians